Between Two Shores is the fifth studio album by Australia vocal duo Vika & Linda Bull. The album features some of the most popular songs of Vika and Linda Bulls's career, including some from their time with Black Sorrows. The album was released on 23 September 2006 via Liberation Records.

The album was dedicated to Stuart Speed, Vika and Linda's bass player who died during the making of the album.

Critical reception
An Amazon.com editorial said: "Highlights include a heavy groove version of the Black Sorrows' hit single of 1989, "Chained to the Wheel"; a reggae take on "When Will You Fall for Me" and a soulful reconstruction of Barry Palmer's "Love Comes Easy".

Track listing

Personnel
 Chris Bekker – acoustic guitar, backing vocals
 Dion Hirini – acoustic guitar, backing vocals
 John Watson – drums and percussion
 Justin Stanford – percussion
 Vika and Linda – percussion and vocals

Release history

References

2006 albums
Vika and Linda albums
Liberation Records albums